St Mary's Church is a church in Ely, Cambridgeshire, located near Ely Cathedral to the west of the Bishop's Palace.

Principally constructed in the 13th century, it was designated as a Grade I listed building in 1950.

Sextry Barn, which stood immediately to the west of the churchyard, was a large 13th-century tithe barn. It was demolished in 1842.

References

Church of England church buildings in Cambridgeshire
Grade I listed churches in Cambridgeshire
Diocese of Ely
Ely, Cambridgeshire